Nowa Grobla  (Nova Hreblia) is a village in the administrative district of Gmina Oleszyce, within Lubaczów County, Subcarpathian Voivodeship, in south-eastern Poland.

References

Nowa Grobla